Ireland national racquetball team represents Ireland and the Racquetball Association of Ireland in racquetball international competitions. It competes as a member of the European Racquetball Federation and International Racquetball Federation. Ireland has won the European Championships 10 times in men's competition, 12 times in women's competition and 10 times overall.

History

Athletes
National team in the 20th European Championships – Hamburg, Germany 2019

National team in the 1st EurAsia Championships – Seoul, South Korea 2019

National team in the 19th IRF World Championships – San Jose, Costa Rica 2018

National team in the 19th European Championships – The Hague, Netherlands 2017

National team in the 18th IRF World Championships – Cali, Colombia 2016

National team in the 18th European Championships – Hamburg, Germany 2015

National team in the 17th IRF World Championships – Burlington, Canada 2014

National team in the 17th European Championships – Brembate, Italy 2013

National team in the 16th IRF World Championships – Santo Domingo, Dominican Republic 2012

National team in the 16th European Championships – Bad Tolz, Germany 2011

National team in the 15th IRF World Championships – Seoul, South Korea 2010

National team in the 15th European Championships – Paris, France 2009

National team in the 14th IRF World Championships – Kingscourt, Ireland 2008

National team in the 14th European Championships - Paris, France 2007

National team in the 13th IRF World Championships – Santo Domingo, Dominican Republic 2006

National team in the 13th European Championships - Hamburg, Germany 2005

National team in the 12th IRF World Championships – Anyang, South Korea 2004

National team in the 12th European Championships - Zootermeer, Netherlands 2003

National team in the 11th IRF World Championships – Puerto Rico 2002

National team in the 11th European Championships - Castlebar, Ireland 2001

National team in the 10th IRF World Championships –  San Luis Potosí, Mexico 2000

National team in the 10th European Championships - Bad Tolz, Germany 1999

''National team in the 9th IRF World Championships – Cocabamba, Bolivia 1998

National team in the 9th European Championships - Hamburg, Germany 1997

National team in the 8th IRF World Championships – Phoenix, USA 1996

National team in the 8th European Championships - Arklow, Ireland 1995

''National team in the 7th IRF World Championships – San Luis Potosí, Mexico 1994

National team in the 7th European Championships - Hamburg, Germany 1993

National team in the 6th IRF World Championships –  Montreal, Canada 1992

National team in the 6th European Championships - Antwerp, Belgium 1991

National team in the 5th IRF World Championships – Caracas, Venezuela 1990

National team in the 5h European Championships - Paris, France 1989

National team in the 4th IRF World Championships – Hamburg, Germany 1988

National team in the 4th European Championships - Zootermeer, Netherlands 1987

National team in the 3rd IRF World Championships – Florida, USA 1986

National team in the 3rd European Championships - Antwerp, Belgium 1985

National team in the World Games – London, England 1985

National team in the 2nd European Championships - Hamburg, Germany 1983

National team in the 2nd IRF World Championships – Sacramento, California, USA 1984

National team in the 1st European Championships - Zootermeer, Netherlands  1981

National team in the 1st IRF World Championships – Santa Clara, USA 1981

References

External links
RAI Racquetball Association Ireland

National racquetball teams
Racquetball
Racquetball in Ireland